LaGrange County Courthouse is a historic courthouse located on Detroit Street in LaGrange, LaGrange County, Indiana. It was designed by Thomas J. Tolan, & Son, Architects of Fort Wayne, Indiana and built in 1878–1879. It is a two-story, rectangular red brick building with Second Empire and Georgian style design elements.  The front facade consists of a central clock tower flanked by square corner pavilions.

It was added to the National Register of Historic Places on July 17, 1980.

References

County courthouses in Indiana
Clock towers in Indiana
Courthouses on the National Register of Historic Places in Indiana
Georgian architecture in Indiana
Second Empire architecture in Indiana
Government buildings completed in 1878
National Register of Historic Places in LaGrange County, Indiana